Jean-François Niceron (5 July 1613 – 22 September 1646) was a French mathematician, Minim friar, and painter of anamorphic art, on which he wrote the ground-breaking book La Perspective Curieuse (Curious Perspectives).

Biography

Jean-François Niceron was a mathematical prodigy. He studied under Father Marin Mersenne, a famed mathematician and Minim friar, at the College de Nevers. In 1632, at the age of nineteen, he joined the Order of Minims.

Niceron was also an artist, with a particular interest in the use of anamorphosis in religious art. He was acquainted with the leading scientists in France and Italy, such as Fermat, Descartes, Cavalieri, and Kircher, and was aware of the latest theoretical developments. Intent on finding a scientific solution to the problems presented by perspective, Niceron worked out the geometric algorithms for producing anamorphic art and in 1638, at the age of 25, published a treatise titled La perspective curieuse, ou magie artificielle des effets merveilleux (roughly translated as "The curious perspective or artificial magic of marvelous effects").

As a number of scientific societies formed in the early 1630s, Niceron became a member of the Circle of Mersenne, which was named after his mentor, Father Marin Mersenne. His connection with these societies led to associations with some of the top intellectuals from Paris and Rome. These relationships with the academic world helped him stay up to date with intellectual advancements. He closely followed optics and geometry, and used this knowledge to create the anamorphic paintings for which he is known.

He died in 1646 in Aix-en-Provence, aged 33. His portrait was engraved by Lasne.

The lexicographer Jean-Pierre Nicéron was a relative.

Publications
 La perspective curieuse, ou magie artificielle des effets merveilleux (Paris, 1638, in-fol., reissued together with l'Optique and Catoptrique by P. Mersenne, ibid., 1652, in-fol.)

 Niceron reworked La perspective curieuse, augmented it with new observations, and translated it into Latin under the title Thaumaturgus opticus, sive amiranda optices, etc. (Paris, 1646, in-fol.) This was to have been followed by two other editions, but Niceron died before he could complete them. The 1638 and 1663 editions are both available online. 

 La perspective curieuse, a richly illustrated manual on perspective, revealed for the first time the secrets of anamorphosis and trompe l'oeil. It contained the first published reference to Descartes's derivation of the law of refraction. First published in 1638 with 25 plates, Niceron's work was enlarged by Roberval and republished in 1663, along with the first edition, posthumously published, of a scholarly work on optics and catoptrics by Mersenne (1588–1648). In the original work, Niceron concentrated primarily on the practical applications of perspective, catoptrics, and dioptrics, and on the illusory effects of optics, then traditionally associated with natural magic. The work's first book (out of four) presents briefly the fundamental geometrical theorems and then develops a general method of perspective, borrowing heavily from Alberti and Dürer. The second book addresses the problem of establishing perspective for paintings executed on curved or irregular surfaces, like vaults and niches, and presents the general technique of anamorphosis. Here Niceron shows, for example, how to construct on the interior surface of a cone a distorted image that, when viewed from the end through the base, appears in proper proportion. Book three discusses and explains the anamorphosis of figures that are viewed by reflection from plane, cylindrical, and conical mirrors. Book four deals with the distortions created by refraction. The added work on optics by Mersenne contained the author's final contributions to optics, including experimental studies of visual acuity and binocular vision and a critical discussion of contemporary hypotheses on the nature of light.

 L'Interprétation des chiffres, ou Règle pour bien entendre et expliquer facilement toutes sortes de chiffres simples, tirée de italien et augmentée, particulièrement à l'usage des langues française et espagnole (Paris, 1641, in-8°). This work has been translated in part by Ant.-Marie Cospi.

See also
List of Roman Catholic scientist-clerics

References

Further reading

 P. J. S. Whitmore: The Order of Minims in Seventeenth-Century France 
 A. De Rosa, edited by : Jean François Nicéron. Perspective, Catoptric and Artificial Magic, with critical editions of La Perspective Curieuse (Paris 1638) and of the Thaumaturgus Opticus (Paris 1646), Aracne edizioni, 24 x 28 cm, 488 pp, Roma 2013 .
 A. De Rosa, Through a glass darkly: the life and work of Minim Jean François Nicéron, in "Bollettino Ufficiale dell’Ordine dei Minimi", n° 5, year LI, January–March 2005.
 A. De Rosa, The Optik's Apocalipse. The twin anamorphosis by Emmanuel Maignan and Jean-François Nicéron, in "Ikhnos", Siracusa 2006.
 A. Bortot, C. Boscaro, A. De Rosa, C. Monteleone, E. Trevisan, Memory and oblivion. Discovery and digital survey of J.-F. Niceron's mural anamorphosis, in "Acts of XVI ASITA National Conference", Vicenza 2012  
 G. D’Acunto, Jean-François Nicéron's Thaumaturgus opticus: between scientific precision and natural magic, in "Bollettino Ufficiale dell’Ordine dei Minimi", n° 2, year LII, April–June 2006.
 I. Rizzini, Jean-François Nicéron's Thaumaturgus opticus: notes on translation from Latin, in "Bollettino Ufficiale dell’Ordine dei Minimi", n° 4, year LI, October–December 2004.
 A. De Rosa, G. D'Acunto, La vertigine dello sguardo. Saggi sulla rappresentazione anamorfica, Cafoscarina, Venezia 2002 .

Other sources
 The painting at the Museum of the History of Science in Florence 
 The Galileo project 
 Mersenne's ‘'catoptrique'’ contains Niceron's plates
 First World Exhibition on Jean François Niceron at University Iuav of Venezia from 22 April until 31 May 2013 
 Joe Frawley, "Curious Perspectives", Joe Frawley Music (ca476) (7 November 2011). Music composed by Joe Frawley  for the exhibition "Jean François Niceron: Perspective, catoptrics & artificial magic", University Iuav, Venice, Italy, 22 April – 31 May 2013 .

1613 births
1646 deaths
Catholic clergy scientists
Minims (religious order)
 French mathematicians